Naval Support Activity Charleston, originally designated Naval Weapons Station Charleston, is a base of the United States Navy located on the west bank of the Cooper River, in the cities of Goose Creek and Hanahan South Carolina. The current workforce (military/civil service/contractor) numbers more than 11,000 with an additional 3,600 people in on-base family housing.

Under the 2005 Base Realignment and Closure Commission's recommendations, the Air Force is to jointly manage Naval Weapons Station Charleston and Charleston Air Force Base as Joint Base Charleston.

History 
Commissioned on November 5, 1941 as the United States Naval Ammunition Depot (NAD) consisted of 6,368 acres this is now the Station's Southside area including the Cooper River waterfront. The facility was used as an ammunition collection and distribution point during World War II. Ammunition manufactured throughout the country was sent to the base and then used to supply ordnance to Atlantic fleet vessels. Following WWII, the Depot was charged with the removal of ordnance from ships being deactivated and was used as a weapons storage site. The NAD's status changed from caretaker to inactive to maintenance to active from 1947 through 1952.

During the mid-1950s, the installation was expanded, the Northside area, another 5,219 acres, was acquired by the Navy in January 1954 and called the Naval Weapons Station Annex and charged with new duties that included the handling of guided missiles and the docking, servicing and loading of submarines.  Base personnel were tasked with arming submarines with the UGM-27 Polaris missile.

In 1960 the Polaris Missile Facility Atlantic (POMFLANT) was constructed within the base to enable the handling of Terrier, Tarter, and, Hawk, missiles. Buildings were added again in 1969 for the Standard and Red Eye missiles. The base continued to grow through the 1970s, the Marrington area, an additional 2,894 acres located between Red Bank Road and Foster Creek, was added to the Station. The Navy designated the eastern half as the Marrington Plantation Outdoor Recreation Area and used the western half for the construction of MenRiv Housing and the adjacent support facilities. On September 30, 1981, the Station  acquired the nearby Charleston Army Depot. The station's name was then changed to Naval Weapons Station South. In 1995 POMFLANT was decommissioned and the fleet ballistic missile operations moved to Kings Bay, Georgia.

The Naval Nuclear Power Training Command school opened in 1998 and occupies over 50 acres in the central part of the original Marrington tract.

Under the 2005 BRAC the Naval Weapons Station was combined with Charleston Air Force Base to create Joint Base Charleston.

Current status 
Portions of The Charleston, South Carolina metropolitan area, (The City of Charleston, The City of North Charleston, The City of Goose Creek, and The City of Hanahan) are home to branches of the United States Military.  During the Cold War, the Naval Base (1902–1996) became the third largest U.S. homeport serving over 80 ships and submarines.  In addition, the Charleston Naval Shipyard repaired frigates, destroyers, cruisers, sub tenders, and submarines.  The Shipyard was also equipped for the refueling of nuclear subs.

During this period, the Weapons Station was the Atlantic Fleet's load out base for all nuclear ballistic missile submarines.  Two SSBN "Boomer" squadrons and a sub tender were homeported at the Weapons Station, while one SSN attack squadron, Submarine Squadron 4, and a sub tender were homeported at the Naval Base.  At the 1996 closure of the Station's Polaris Missile Facility Atlantic (POMFLANT), over 2,500 nuclear warheads and their UGM-27 Polaris, UGM-73 Poseidon, and UGM-96 Trident I delivery missiles (SLBM) were stored and maintained, guarded by a U.S. Marine Corps Security Force Company.

The Naval Support Activity expanded its mission and Department of Defense support role over time with over 40 tenant commands, and today is a training center, with the Naval Nuclear Power Training Command (NNPTC), Nuclear Power Training Unit, Propulsion Facility, and Border Patrol satellite academy; Naval Consolidated Brig, Charleston; Navy Munitions Command Unit Charleston; Explosive Ordnance Detachments; Marine Corps Reserve Center; Naval Information Warface Center Atlantic (NIWC-LANT, the largest employer in the Charleston area); 269 above-ground ammunition magazines, maintenance and storage of military ordnance including mines, and serves as an Army logistics hub, the busiest continental United States surface port in the defense transportation system.  In addition, it contains more than 1,800 on-base houses for Navy enlisted and officer dependents as well as Coast Guard dependents, and has a child care facility, elementary and middle schools.  A large medical clinic near NNPTC in Goose Creek was added in 2008.

Today, Joint Base Charleston, encompassing over 20,877 acres and supporting 53 Military Commands and Federal Agencies, provides service to over 79,000 Airmen, Sailors, Soldiers, Marines, Coast Guardsmen, DOD civilians, dependents, and retirees.

The former Charleston Naval Base has been transformed into a multi-use Federal Complex (231 acres) with 17 government and armed forces tenants, as well as homeport for 6 Roll-On/Roll-Off (RORO) Military Sealift Command Ships, 3 Coast Guard National Security Cutters, and 2 National Oceanic and Atmospheric Administration (NOAA) Research Ships.

NSA Charleston remains a Commander, Navy Installations Command administrative support installation assigned to Commander, Navy Region Southeast, located on the Joint Base Charleston Naval Weapons Station.  NSA Charleston was reorganized as an "Embedded Military Unit" within the Joint Base Charleston 628th Air Base Wing. NSA Charleston Navy personnel are embedded into the Air Base Wing installation support squadrons to carry out their functions.  After the creation of the Joint Base, the NSA Charleston Commanding Officer became the Deputy Commander of the 628th Air Base Wing, responsible to the Wing Commander for base installation support operations.

Tenants

Navy 
Charleston Naval Weapons Station, Joint Base Charleston (>17,000 acres, 27 square miles), Goose Creek and Hanahan
Naval Information Warfare Center Atlantic (NIWC Atlantic) 
Naval Nuclear Power Training Command
Nuclear Power School
Nuclear Power Training Unit
Moored Training Nuclear Submarine, USS Daniel Webster (SSBN-626)
Moored Training Nuclear Submarine, USS Sam Rayburn (SSBN-635)
Moored Training Nuclear Submarine, USS La Jolla (SSN-701)
Moored Training Nuclear Submarine, USS San Francisco (SSN-711)
Naval Consolidated Brig, Charleston, East Coast
Mobile Mine Assembly Unit Eleven (MOMAU-11)
Naval Operations Support Center Charleston
Navy Reserve Center
Navy Munitions Command CONUS, Detachment Charleston
Explosive Ordnance Detachment
Naval Health Clinic Charleston
Navy Dental Clinic
Naval Criminal Investigative Service Training, Federal Complex
Lay berth for Roll-On Roll-Off Naval Ships, Military Sealift Command, Federal Complex
MV Cape Ducato (T-AKR-5051), Military Sealift Command Ship, Ready Reserve Force, Federal Complex
MV Cape Douglas (T-AKR-5052), Military Sealift Command Ship, Ready Reserve Force, Federal Complex
MV Cape Domingo (T-AKR-5053), Military Sealift Command Ship, Ready Reserve Force, Federal Complex
MV Cape Decision (T-AKR-5054), Military Sealift Command Ship, Ready Reserve Force, Federal Complex
MV Cape Diamond (T-AKR-5055), Military Sealift Command Ship, Ready Reserve Force, Federal Complex
MV Cape Edmont (T-AKR-5069),  Military Sealift Command Ship, Ready Reserve Force, Federal Complex

Air Force 
Charleston Air Force Base, Joint Base Charleston (3,877 acres, 6.06 square miles), North Charleston
Charleston Air Force Auxiliary Base, North, SC (2,393 acres, 3.74 square miles)
Charleston Defense Fuel Storage and Distribution Facility, Hanahan
628th Air Base Wing
628th Mission Support Group
628th Medical Group
315th Airlift Wing
437th Airlift Wing
373rd Training Squadron, Detachment 5
1st Combat Camera Squadron
412th Logistics Support Squadron OL-AC
Air Force ROTC Det 772
Civil Air Patrol – Charleston Composite Squadron

Marines 
Marine Corps Reserve Center, Naval Weapons Station Which now supports 4th Medical Logistics Company

Coast Guard 
In October 2020, the Coast Guard purchased 166 acres on the former Naval complex to construct a super base, so as to consolidate all Charleston area facilities and become the homeport for five Security cutters and additional offshore cutters. 
Coast Guard Sector Charleston (District 7)
Coast Guard Station Charleston
Coast Guard Helicopter Air Facility, Johns Island
Coast Guard Reserves, Charleston
Coast Guard Maritime Law Enforcement Academy, Federal Complex
USCGC Hamilton (WMSL-753) National Security Cutter, Federal Complex
USCGC James (WMSL-754) National Security Cutter, Federal Complex
USCGC Stone (WMSL-758) National Security Cutter, Federal Complex
USCGC Calhoun (WMSL-759) National Security Cutter, 2023 Delivery, Federal Complex
USCGC Friedman (WMSL-760) National Security Cutter, 2023 Delivery, Federal Complex
USCGC Tarpon, Marine Protector-class coastal patrol boat, Tybee Island
USCGC Yellowfin, Marine Protector-class coastal patrol boat, Charleston
USCGC Anvil, 75-foot inland construction tender,  Charleston
USCGC Willow (WLB-202), Charleston

Army 
United States Army Corps of Engineers, Charleston District
South Carolina Army National Guard
Army Reserve Training Center, Naval Weapons Station
841st Transportation Battalion, Naval Weapons Station
1182d Deployment & Distribution Support Battalion (USAR), Naval Weapons Station
1189th Transportation Brigade, Reserve Support Command (USAR), Naval Weapons Station
Army Strategic Logistics Activity, Naval Weapons Station

Federal Complex (former Naval Base Charleston), North Charleston 

The former NAVBASE Charleston has been transformed into a multi-use Federal Complex (231 acres) with 17 Government and Military tenants, as well as homeport for 6 RO-RO Military Sealift Command Ships, 3 Coast Guard National Security Cutters (NSCs), and 2 NOAA Research Ships.  In October 2020, the Coast Guard purchased 166 acres on the former Naval complex to construct a super base, so as to consolidate all Charleston area facilities and become the homeport for five NSCs and additional Offshore Patrol Cutters (OPCs). 

Federal Law Enforcement Training Centers (FLETC), Department of Homeland Security
Moored FLETC Training Ship, SS Cape Chalmers (T-AK-5036)
Sea Hawk Interagency Operations Center
Customs and Border Protection Satellite Academy
Immigration and Customs Enforcement Satellite Academy
U.S. Courts, Federal Probation and Pretrial Services Academy
Food and Drug Administration Training Academy
National Oceanic and Atmospheric Administration (NOAA)
NOAAS Nancy Foster (R 352) Ship
NOAAS Ronald H. Brown (R 104) Ship
U.S. Department of State
Global Financial Services Center, U.S. Department of State
Passport Service Center, U.S. Department of State
United States Maritime Administration

References

External links 

 
 
 globalsecurity.org: NWS Charleston

Charleston
Military installations in South Carolina
Charleston County, South Carolina
Berkeley County, South Carolina
Goose Creek, South Carolina